Euler calculus is a methodology from applied algebraic topology and integral geometry that integrates constructible functions and more recently definable functions by integrating with respect to the Euler characteristic as a finitely-additive measure. In the presence of a metric, it can be extended to continuous integrands via the Gauss–Bonnet theorem. It was introduced independently by Pierre Schapira and Oleg Viro in 1988, and is useful for enumeration problems in computational geometry and sensor networks.

See also
Topological data analysis

References

Van den Dries, Lou. Tame Topology and O-minimal Structures, Cambridge University Press, 1998. 
 Arnold, V. I.; Goryunov, V. V.; Lyashko, O. V. Singularity Theory, Volume 1, Springer, 1998, p. 219.

External links
 Ghrist, Robert. Euler Calculus video presentation, June 2009. published 30 July 2009.

Algebraic topology
Computational topology
Integral geometry
Measure theory